The Wellesley Apple Jacks are a Canadian Junior ice hockey team based in Wellesley, Ontario.  They play in the Provincial Junior Hockey League of the Ontario Hockey Association.

History

The Wellesley Apple Jacks joined the Western Junior D Hockey League in 1987.  A year later, the Western League absorbed the Southern Junior D Hockey League.  They operated under the Western moniker for three more years.

In 1991, the Western League was dissolved and the OHA Junior Development League was created.  At this time, the Apple Jacks turned into a team to reckon with.

In the early years of the OHAJDL, the league was dominated by the Thamesford Trojans and Lucan Irish, but come the 1995–96 season the Apple Jacks made their first finals appearance of what would be four consecutive years.

In the 1996 OHA Cup Finals, the Apple Jacks fell to the Exeter Hawks 4-games-to-3.  This came after finishing 2nd place in the entire league with 27 wins.

The 1996–97 season had the Apple Jacks finish second again with 28 wins, but lose in the OHA Cup final 4-games-to-none to the Mount Brydges Bulldogs.

The 1997–98 season was one for the ages for the Apple Jacks.  They finished first in the OHAJDL with 28 wins and made it all the way to the league final for the third straight year.  They defeated the Exeter Hawks 4-games-to-3 to win their first OHA Cup.

The 1998–99 season, the Applejacks again finished first in the league with 30 wins.  In the playoff they made it to the league final for the fourth straight year only to lose 4-games-to-3 to the Lucan Irish.

In 2000–01, the Wellesley Apple Jacks found their footing again.  They finished fifth in the OHAJDL with 25 wins and made it to the OHA Cup final again.  This time they lost 4-games-to-1 to the Mount Brydges Bulldogs.

In 2002–03, the Apple Jacks finished the season in 8th place with 19 wins.  They surprised the league and made it to the league finals again.  Wellesley ended up getting swept by the Thamesford Trojans 4-games-to-none.

In 2006, the OHAJDL was dissolved and the Apple Jacks joined the Southern Ontario Junior Hockey League—which was promoted to Junior C officially in 2012.

In the Summer of 2013, the Ontario Hockey Association realigned the leagues and the Apple Jacks ended up in the new Midwestern Junior C Hockey League. The summer of 2016 brought more league changes to the Applejacks. The eight southern Ontario junior "C" hockey leagues amalgamated into one league dubbed the Provincial Junior Hockey League.  The Midwestern league became the Doherty division in the South Conference.

Season-by-season record

References

External links
Apple Jacks' Homepage

Southern Ontario Junior Hockey League teams
Wellesley, Ontario